Yasuaki Taiho, also known by his Chinese name Chen Ta-Feng, (15 November 1963 – 18 January 2015) was a Taiwanese professional baseball player in Nippon Professional Baseball for the Hanshin Tigers and Chunichi Dragons. He was picked in the second round of the 1988 draft and debuted the next year. In June 1997, Taiho was involved in an altercation with Mike DiMuro. The American umpire had arrived in March to show Japanese leagues the Major League Baseball officiating standard. Taiho disagreed with DiMuro's strike zone and was ejected. Taiho pushed DiMuro in protest, and his teammates streamed onto the field. No player was penalized for their actions. DiMuro, surprised by this show of disrespect, resigned from NPB and returned to the United States. After his retirement from baseball, Taiho worked as a scout and Little League coach. He also ran Chinese restaurants in Kaizu and Nagoya, where he died of acute myeloid leukemia on 18 January 2015.

His brother  was also a professional baseball player.

References

External links
 
 

1963 births
2015 deaths
Chunichi Dragons players
Deaths from cancer in Japan
Deaths from leukemia
Fu Jen Catholic University alumni
Hanshin Tigers players
Nagoya University alumni
Nippon Professional Baseball first basemen
Nippon Professional Baseball left fielders
People from Nantou County
Taiwanese expatriate baseball players in Japan
Taiwanese restaurateurs